Mario Neunaber (born 17 March 1982) is a German former professional footballer who played as a defender.

Career
Born in Bremen, Neunaber is a Werder Bremen youth product.

He made his debut on the professional league level when he started in the 2. Bundesliga game for FC Ingolstadt 04 against Greuther Fürth on 17 August 2008.

In June 2014, Neunaber joined Rot-Weiss Essen. There he won the Lower Rhine Cup in 2015. By the end of that season he ended his career.

References

External links
 

1982 births
Living people
Footballers from Bremen
German footballers
Association football defenders
2. Bundesliga players
3. Liga players
SV Werder Bremen II players
FC Sachsen Leipzig players
SC Preußen Münster players
Kickers Emden players
FC Ingolstadt 04 players
Wuppertaler SV players
KSV Hessen Kassel players
SSV Jahn Regensburg players
Rot-Weiss Essen players